Rossoshino is a rural locality (a settlement) in Bauntovsky District, Republic of Buryatia, Russia. The population was 249 as of 2017. There are nine streets.

Geography 
Mongoy is the nearest rural locality.

References 

Rural localities in Bauntovsky District